Pannon Cycling Team is a UCI Continental team founded in 2018 and based in Hungary. It participates in UCI Continental Circuits races.

Team roster

Major results
2018
 U23 Time Trial Championships, Attila Valter
 U23 Road Race Championships, Attila Valter

2019
V4 Special Series Debrecen - Ibrany, János Pelikán
Gemenc Grand Prix II, János Pelikán
Stage 2 Tour de Serbia, János Pelikán

National Champions
2018
 U23 Time Trial, Attila Valter
 U23 Road Race, Attila Valter

References

UCI Continental Teams (Europe)
Cycling teams based in Hungary
Cycling teams established in 2016